St Mary of Bethany Church is located in Woking, England. The church is in the Diocese of Guildford.

History
St Mary of Bethany Church was founded to service the expanding town of Woking in Surrey. The Rev William Hamilton the vicar of Christ Church Woking saw a need for the expanding town south of the railway. Three plots of land between Mount Hermon Road and York Road were purchased in 1899 when the farmland was offered for development.

The building was started in 1906 and finished in 1907 as a Chapel of Ease to Christ Church.

It was designed by W. D. Caröe and was consecrated on 5 November 1907 by Herbert Edward Ryle, the Bishop of Winchester.

Inside the building are war memorials for the First and Second World Wars.

Building design
Free tudor gothic design. Built of brick with tiled and stone dressings. Tiled roof.
Listing NGR: TQ0022758201

The building is Grade II listed.

List of vicars

References

Further reading
 Richard Langtree "Both Sides of the Bridges: The Story of St Mary of Bethany Parish Church Woking, 1907–2007" 

Woking
Woking
1906 establishments in England
Churches completed in 1907
Diocese of Guildford
Grade II listed churches in Surrey
Buildings by W. D. Caröe